The Harty Baronetcy, of Prospect House in Roebuck in the County of Dublin, was a title in the Baronetage of the United Kingdom. It was created on 30 September 1831 for Robert Harty, Lord Mayor of Dublin. The title became extinct on the death of the fourth Baronet in 1939.

Harty baronets, of Prospect House (1831)

Sir Robert Way Harty, 1st Baronet (1779–1832)
Sir Robert Harty, 2nd Baronet (1815–1902)
Sir Henry Lockington Harty, 3rd Baronet (1826–1913)
Sir Lionel Lockington Harty, 4th Baronet (1864–1939)

References

Extinct baronetcies in the Baronetage of the United Kingdom